Martin Freinademetz (born 10 December 1969) is an Austrian snowboarder. He competed in the men's giant slalom event at the 1998 Winter Olympics.

References

1969 births
Living people
Austrian male snowboarders
Olympic snowboarders of Austria
Snowboarders at the 1998 Winter Olympics
Sportspeople from Innsbruck